Stanislav Luca (born 28 June 1986) is a Moldovan football manager and former player who is currently the head coach of Sfîntul Gheorghe.

Playing career
Born in Chișinău, Moldova, Luca started his career with Zimbru Chișinău, where he made his senior debut in the 2003–04 season. He later spent eight seasons with Rapid Ghidighici from 2007 to 2014, after which he played for Costuleni, Spicul Chișcăreni and Ungheni. He finished his playing career with Sfîntul Gheorghe in 2017.

Managerial career
In December 2017, he became a coach at Sfîntul Gheorghe. In 2018, he was the head coach of the reserve team of the club. In 2019, he was appointed assistant coach of the first team, a position he held until he was appointed head coach in September 2021.

References

1990 births
Living people
Moldovan footballers
Association football forwards
FC Rapid Ghidighici players
FC Costuleni players
FC Spicul Chișcăreni players
FC Ungheni players
FC Sfîntul Gheorghe players
Moldovan football managers
FC Sfîntul Gheorghe managers
Moldovan Super Liga managers